NAFR may refer to:

 Naval Air Force Reserve, a component of the United States Navy Reserve
 Nellis Air Force Range, former name of the Nevada Test and Training Range